This is a list of settlements in Wiltshire by population based on the results of the 2011 census. The next United Kingdom census will take place in 2021. In 2011, there were 19 built-up area subdivisions with 5,000 or more inhabitants in Wiltshire. These are shown in the table below along with some less populous settlements.


Population ranking

Gallery of some of the settlements

See also 

 Wiltshire

References 

Wiltshire
settlements in Wiltshire by population